The lesser short-tailed gerbil (Dipodillus simoni) is distributed mainly from eastern Morocco to Egypt. It is also known as Simon's dipodil. After morphological and molecular studies in 2010 Dipodillus was ranged as a subgenus of Gerbillus, and Dipodillus simoni was renamed into Gerbillus simoni.

References

  Database entry includes a brief justification of why this species is of least concern
Musser, G. G. and M. D. Carleton. 2005. Superfamily Muroidea. pp. 894–1531 in Mammal Species of the World a Taxonomic and Geographic Reference. D. E. Wilson and D. M. Reeder eds. Johns Hopkins University Press, Baltimore.

Dipodillus
Rodents of North Africa
Mammals described in 1881